Jerel Christopher Ifil (born 27 June 1982) is an English footballer who plays as a defender who plays for Swindon Supermarine. He is the elder brother of fellow footballer Philip Ifil.

Born in Wembley, Greater London, to a Greek-Cypriot mother and father from the West Indies,  Ifil started his career at Watford where he made his debut in the 2002–03 season. Initially, he went on loan to Huddersfield Town where he played four times.

Ifil originally signed for Swindon Town on a three-month loan deal from Watford in January 2003, returning to the club in September later that year where he further impressed, prompting manager Andy King to request Ifil's loan to be extended but this was refused by Watford. However, Ifil returned on another three-month loan just over a week later in January 2004. After a drawn out transfer saga, the two clubs agreed a £70,000 bid for the player, Ifil signed a two-year deal at Swindon in July 2004. By the time of his departure from the club in 2009, he was Swindon's longest serving player.

In August 2009 Ifil appeared as a trialist for Scottish Premier League side Aberdeen in their 1–0 win over Hull City in a testimonial for Dean Windass. He subsequently signed a two-year deal with the club on 12 August 2009. He made his debut in a 3–1 loss to Celtic on the opening day of the 2009–10 SPL season.

On 31 January 2011, Ifil was released by Aberdeen. On 24 February, Ifil signed for Bristol Rovers on non-contract terms until the end of the 2010–2011 season. He was one of seventeen players released by the team in May 2011.

On 25 July 2011, he signed a two-year contract with Kettering Town.

Having trialled with Torquay United earlier in the summer, he signed for Sutton United at the start of September 2012 and then moved to Boreham Wood shortly afterwards. In November 2012 he joined Staines Town, playing for them until December 2014.

In 2018, after four years out of the game, Ifil joined Swindon Supermarine.

References

External links

1982 births
Living people
Footballers from Wembley
Association football defenders
English footballers
Watford F.C. players
Huddersfield Town A.F.C. players
Swindon Town F.C. players
Aberdeen F.C. players
Bristol Rovers F.C. players
Kettering Town F.C. players
Sutton United F.C. players
Boreham Wood F.C. players
Staines Town F.C. players
English Football League players
Scottish Premier League players
National League (English football) players